Swift Creek is a southward-flowing tributary of the Baker River, about  long, in Whatcom County in the U.S. state of Washington. It rises in glaciers near Table Mountain,  Mount Ann, and Kulshan Ridge, and flows west before being joined by more glacial tributaries. It then winds south-southeast for several miles to Baker Lake reservoir, and there it is joined by Morovitz Creek directly before it enters the lake. Park Creek is a small east-flowing stream that enters Baker Lake very near Swift Creek, but should not be confused as a tributary with it. NFD 11 (Baker Lake Road) crosses the creek near its mouth, which is just downstream of Shannon Creek.

See also
List of rivers of Washington

References

Rivers of Washington (state)
North Cascades of Washington (state)
Rivers of Whatcom County, Washington